Catenococcus is a Gram-negative and facultatively anaerobic genus of bacteria from the family of Vibrionaceae with one known species (Catenococcus thiocycli).

References

 

Vibrionales
Bacteria genera
Monotypic bacteria genera